Lowesby railway station (originally Loseby) was a railway station serving the villages of Lowesby and Tilton on the Hill, Leicestershire, England on the Great Northern Railway Leicester branch.

Overview
The station opened in 1882 (as Loseby) and was one of two stations serving Tilton, the other being Tilton station. For Tilton villagers travelling to Leicester, however, Lowesby station was preferred, because it was nearer by public footpath (1 mile vs 1.2 miles), had more trains, and because the train journey was 2.5 miles shorter and therefore cheaper. Reflecting this, several commuter trains from Leicester terminated at Lowesby, although these were withdrawn in 1916 together with the Leicester to Peterborough trains. The station was renamed Lowesby in 1916.

The station closed to regular traffic in 1953, although summer excursion trains to Skegness and Mablethorpe continued until the end of the 1962 season. To the east of the station was Marefield Junction.

Train Timetable for April 1910
The table below shows the train departures from Lowesby in April 1910.

References

Disused railway stations in Leicestershire
Railway stations in Great Britain opened in 1882
Railway stations in Great Britain closed in 1953
Former Great Northern Railway stations
1882 establishments in England